The Comoro ground gecko (Paroedura sanctijohannis) is a species of lizard in the family Gekkonidae. The species is endemic to the Comoro Islands.

Etymology
The specific name, sanctijohannis, refers to the island formerly called Johanna, now called Anjouan.

Habitat

Reproduction
P. sanctijohannis is oviparous.

References

Further reading
Boulenger GA (1885). Catalogue of the Lizards in the British Museum (Natural History). Second Edition. Volume I. Geckonidæ ... London: Trustees of the British Museum (Natural History). (Taylor and Francis, printers). xii + 436 pp. + Plates I–XXXII. (Phyllodactylus sancti-johannis, p. 86 + Plate VII, figures 1, 1a).
Günther A (1879). "On Mammals and Reptiles from Johanna, Comoro Islands". Annals and Magazine of Natural History, Fifth Series 3: 215–219. (Parœdura sancti johannis, new species, p. 218).
Hawlitschek O, Glaw F (2012). "The complex colonization history of nocturnal geckos (Paroedura) in the Comoros Archipelago". Zoologica Scripta 42 (2): 135–150.
Rösler H (2000). "Kommentierte Liste der rezent, subrezent und fossil bekannten Geckotaxa (Reptilia: Gekkonomorpha)". Gekkota 2: 28–153. (Paroedura sanctijohannis, p. 101). (in German).

Paroedura
Reptiles described in 1879
Taxa named by Albert Günther